Alistair Austin Rothwell Groves is a British record producer, currently based in Liverpool, England. He is renowned for his focus on guitar based popular music. He works at The Motor Museum, Liverpool and is a guest lecturer in music production at Liverpool Institute of Performing Arts.

Career
Groves took his first steps into music production whilst a student at Liverpool John Moore's University in around 2005. After success in setting up a small, basic recording studio in his student house, an opportunity came about to create and manage Sandhills Studio, an independent recording studio in the Vauxhall district of Liverpool.

Through Sandhills, Groves built a reputation as a reliable and exciting engineer, whilst developing his ear and own ideas in production. He worked with a growing clientele at Sandhills, from small, independent bands to world famous musicians, including Elvis Costello, Ian Broudie and Claire Sweeney. After several successful years during a time of general upheaval in the industry, Groves left Sandhills in 2012 to become manager and resident producer of the Motor Museum, Liverpool. In early 2015, Groves traveled to Santorini, Greece to engineer Bring Me the Horizon's fifth studio album That's the Spirit, having worked with the band on the first single for the album ("Drown") at the Motor Museum the previous year.

Groves recently recorded the debut single "Lost and Found" for the Blackpool based band, The Slumdogs.

References

British record producers